Qinghai is a province of the People's Republic of China.

Qinghai may also refer to:
Qinghai Lake, China
Qinghai Plateau, China

See also
Ching Hai, a Vietnamese spiritual leader